General elections were held in Guatemala on 1 March 1970. No candidate received over 50% of the vote in the presidential election, resulting in Carlos Manuel Arana Osorio being elected by Congress on 21 March by a vote of 37 to 17. The National Liberation Movement–Institutional Democratic Party alliance also won the Congressional elections. Voter turnout was 53.82% in the presidential election and 53.26% in the Congressional elections.

Results

President

Congress

References

Bibliography
 Guía del organismo legislativo República de Guatemala. Preparada por el Instituto Nacional de Administración para el Desarrollo, Dobierno de la República. 1968.
 Villagrán Kramer, Francisco. Biografía política de Guatemala: años de guerra y años de paz. FLACSO-Guatemala, 2004.
 Political handbook of the world 1970. New York, 1971.

Elections in Guatemala
Guatemala
1970 in Guatemala
Presidential elections in Guatemala